DomiNations is a 2015 freemium mobile massively multiplayer strategy video game developed and published by Big Huge Games. The game was released on April 1, 2015.

Gameplay

DomiNations is a massively multiplayer online game.  Players build a base with Defensive, Economy, and Army. An example of a military building is the Barracks along with several wonders of the world and a Town Centre. After training appropriate troops, players search for suitable opponents to attack and gain loot and medals.

Players can choose to play as any of the 8 different nations - British, Chinese, French, German, Greek, Japanese, Korean or  Roman; and advance through 16 ages from Dawn Age to Drone Age, expanding the base in each age.

There is also a single player campaign where players practice strategies by battling in a historical perspective. DomiNations introduced World War on December 2, 2015.

Reception

Reviewers have compared the game with Clash of Clans, and the reviewers generally do not regard the two games being too similar. As of March 2016, the game had been downloaded over 19 million times.

References

External links
 

2015 video games
Android (operating system) games
IOS games
Massively multiplayer online real-time strategy games
Free-to-play video games
Video games developed in the United States
Big Huge Games games